

Time line chart 

This time line of the geologic history of the United States chronologically lists important events occurring within the present political boundaries of United States (including territories) before 12,000 years ago.  This time line segment may include some events that occurred outside these borders that profoundly influenced later American life and its present landscape.  It also includes evidence of Native American communities predating the Clovis culture.

Because of the inaccuracies inherent in radiocarbon dating and other methods of interpreting the geologic (and archaeological) record, most dates in this time line represent approximations that may vary considerably from source to source.  The assumptions implicit in geologic dating methods also may yield a general bias in the dating in this time line.

 1,600,000 to 10,000 years ago:  The Pleistocene Epoch; humans arrive in North America at the end of the epoch.
 200,000 years ago:  Oldest archaeological claim of human habitation in Africa
 50,000 years ago:  Current practical limit of radiocarbon dating.
 42,000 to 21,000 years ago: Geneticists estimate that people of eastern Siberia and Native Americans belonged to the same population.
 41,000 years ago: Bear remains from a cave on Prince of Wales Island, Alaska; humans visited tens of thousands of years later.
 40,000 to 30,000 years ago: The Australian Aborigines reach their continent by boat, leading some archaeologists to suggest that the First Americans might have reached the Americas by travel overseas.
 35,000 years ago:  California linguist Johanna Nichols estimates that diversification began in the Native American people.
 35,000 to 25,000 years ago:  Humans reach far eastern Siberia opposite Alaska.
 25,000 to 10,000 years ago:  Natural land bridge of Beringia connects Siberian Far East with Alaska.
 23,000 years ago:  Cordilleran Ice Sheet closes Pacific coast to overland travel.
 23,000 to 19,000 years ago:  During these coldest millennia, glacial lobes hundreds of kilometers wide flowed into the North Pacific Ocean.
 16,500 years ago:  Solutrean Period in prehistoric Europe ends after producing artifacts vaguely similar to those of Clovis, New Mexico.
 16,000 years ago: Earliest radiocarbon dating from the Cactus Hill, Virginia archaeological site with human artifacts buried below Clovis fluted-point spear points.
 15,000 years ago: First Native Americans probably have arrived in Alaska from Siberia-—possibly much earlier.
 14,250 years ago: Unmistakable human artifacts deposited into sediments of this age at Meadowcroft Rockshelter, Pennsylvania.
 14,000 years ago:  Vast North American ice sheets retreat, opening Pacific coast route southward from Alaska to overland travel.
 14,000 to 13,000 years ago:  A warming climate leaves the Pacific coast of North America ice-free during summer, opening the possibility of southward migration.
 13,000 years ago: Asians had begun walking across the land bridge from Siberia to become the first Native Americans.
 12,500 years ago: Radiocarbon dating of organic remains excavated at Monte Verde, Chile indicate that people lived in the Americas, probably migrating from Siberia along the Pacific coast

United States
Geologic history of the United States
Timeline
United States